The ABET (incorporated as the Accreditation Board for Engineering and Technology, Inc.) is a non-governmental organization that accredits post-secondary education programs in applied and natural sciences, computing, engineering and engineering technology.

Overview
The accreditation of programs mentioned above occurs mainly in the United States but also internationally. , 4,307 programs are accredited, distributed over 846 institutions in 41 countries.

ABET is the recognized U.S. accreditor of college and university programs in applied and natural science, computing, engineering and engineering technology. ABET also provides leadership internationally through workshops, memoranda of understanding and mutual recognition agreements, such as the Washington Accord. ABET also evaluates programs offered in a 100-percent online format.

History
ABET was established in 1932 as the Engineers' Council for Professional Development (ECPD) by seven engineering societies listed below:

 the American Society of Civil Engineers (ASCE), 
 the American Institute of Mining and Metallurgical Engineers – now the American Institute of Mining, Metallurgical, and Petroleum Engineers (AIME),
 the American Society of Mechanical Engineers (ASME), 
 the American Institute of Electrical Engineers – now the Institute of Electrical and Electronics Engineers (IEEE),
 the Society for the Promotion of Engineering Education – now the American Society for Engineering Education (ASEE), 
 the American Institute of Chemical Engineers (AIChE) and 
 the National Council of State Boards of Engineering Examiners – now the National Council of Examiners for Engineering and Surveying (NCEES).

ECPD was founded to provide a "joint program for upbuilding engineering as a profession." However, it almost immediately began developing as an accreditation agency, evaluating its first engineering program in 1936 and its first engineering technology program in 1946. By 1947, 580 programs at 133 institutions had been accredited.

ECPD changed its name to the Accreditation Board for Engineering and Technology, Inc. in 1980 and began doing business as ABET in 2005. In 1985, ABET helped establish the Computing Sciences Accreditation Board (CSAB), which is now one of ABET's largest member societies with over 300 programs, in response to a dramatic rise in interest of computer science education.

Members
ABET is a federation of 35 professional and technical member societies representing the fields of applied science, computing, engineering and engineering technology.

Member societies
 AAEES – American Academy of Environmental Engineers and Scientists
 AAMI – Association for the Advancement of Medical Instrumentation
 ACerS – American Ceramic Society with their National Institute of Ceramic Engineers (NICE)
 AIAA – American Institute of Aeronautics and Astronautics
 AIChE – American Institute of Chemical Engineers
 AIHA – American Industrial Hygiene Association
 ANS – American Nuclear Society
 ASABE – American Society of Agricultural and Biological Engineers
 ASCE – American Society of Civil Engineers
 ASEE – American Society for Engineering Education
 ASHRAE – American Society of Heating, Refrigerating and Air-Conditioning Engineers
 ASME – American Society of Mechanical Engineers
 ASSP – American Society of Safety Professionals
AWS - American Welding Society
 BMES – Biomedical Engineering Society
 CMAA – Construction Management Association of America
 CSAB – formerly called the Computing Sciences Accreditation Board
 IEEE – officially still the Institute of Electrical and Electronics Engineers
 IISE – Institute of Industrial and Systems Engineers
 INCOSE – International Council on Systems Engineering
 ISA – formerly the Instrument Society of America, now International Society of Automation
 MRS – Materials Research Society
 NCEES – National Council of Examiners for Engineering and Surveying
 NSPE – National Society of Professional Engineers
 NSPS – National Society of Professional Surveyors
 SAE International – formerly called the Society of Automotive Engineers
 SFPE – Society of Fire Protection Engineers
 SME – Society of Manufacturing Engineers
 SME-AIME – Society for Mining, Metallurgy and Exploration, Inc.
 SNAME – Society of Naval Architects and Marine Engineers
 SPE – Society of Petroleum Engineers
 SPIE – formerly called the Society of Photo-Optical Instrumentation Engineers
 SWE – Society of Women Engineers
 TMS – The Minerals, Metals & Materials Society
 WEPAN – Women in Engineering ProActive Network

Accredited programs

The ABET accreditation process
ABET accredits post-secondary degree-granting programs offered by institutions that are regionally accredited in the U.S. and nationally accredited outside of the U.S. Certification, training or doctoral programs are not accredited.

ABET accreditation is voluntary; the request for accreditation is initiated by the institution seeking accreditation. Accreditation is given to individual programs within an institution rather than to the institution as a whole. Accredited programs must request re-evaluation every six years to retain accreditation; if the accreditation criteria are not satisfied, additional evaluations may be required within the six-year interval. Programs without previous accreditation can apply for accreditation as long as they have produced at least one program graduate.

The first step in securing or retaining ABET accreditation is for an institution to request an evaluation of its program(s) by January 31 of the year in which accreditation is being sought. The eligibility of the institution must be established, which can be satisfied if the institution is accredited by a regional accreditation agency. Each program is then assigned to one of four accreditation commissions within ABET:

 Applied and Natural Science Accreditation Commission (ANSAC)
 Computing Accreditation Commission (CAC)
 Engineering Accreditation Commission (EAC)
 Engineering Technology Accreditation Commission (ETAC)

The program is assigned to a commission based on its title (the program name shown on the transcript). Each commission has different accreditation criteria.

Each program then conducts an internal evaluation and completes a self-study report. The self-study documents how well the program is meeting the established accreditation criteria in multiple areas, such as their students, curriculum, faculty, administration, facilities and institutional support. The self-study report must be provided to ABET by July 1.

While the program conducts its self-study, the appropriate ABET commission (Applied and Natural Science, Computing, Engineering or Engineering Technology Commission) will choose a team chair to head the on-campus evaluation visit. A visit date (generally in the September – December time frame) is negotiated between the team chair and the institution. Once the date is set, the ABET commission will assign program evaluators (generally one per program being evaluated). The institution is provided the opportunity to reject the team chair or program evaluators if a conflict of interest is perceived. The team chair and evaluators are volunteers from academe, government, industry and private practice.

Once the program evaluators are accepted by the institution, they are provided with the self-study report for their assigned program. This report forms the basis of their evaluation of the program and prepares them for the campus visit.

The evaluation team (team chair and program evaluators) will normally arrive on campus on a Saturday or Sunday. During the on-campus visit, the evaluation team will review course materials from each program, as well as student projects and sample assignments. Evaluators will also interview students, faculty and administrators and tour the facilities to investigate any questions raised by the self-study. The visit will normally conclude the following Tuesday with an exit interview with the institution's chief executive officer, dean and other appropriate institution personnel as appropriate. This interview is intended to summarize the results of the evaluation for each program.

Following the campus visit, the institution has 7 days in which to correct perceived errors of fact communicated during the exit interview. Following this period, the team chair will begin preparation of a draft statement to the institution; this statement undergoes extensive editing and will typically be provided to the institution several months after the visit. On receipt of the draft statement, the institution has 30 days to respond to issues identified in the evaluation. After this response, the team chair prepares a final statement to the institution.

The final statement and recommended accreditation action is reviewed by the large annual meeting of all ABET commission members in July after the campus visit. Based on the findings, the commission members vote on the final accreditation action and the school is notified of the decision in August.

The information the school receives identifies strengths, concerns, weaknesses and deficiencies of the program, as well as recommendations for compliance with ABET criteria. Accreditation is granted for a maximum of six years, after which the institution must request another evaluation.

Criteria
ABET specifies minimum curricula for various engineering programs. For instance, ABET requires that all engineering graduates of a baccalaureate program receive at least one year of study in the natural or physical sciences and mathematics and requires some study within general education. ABET also requires that each student complete a capstone project or design class in their education. Because of ABET's involvement, engineering curricula are somewhat standardized at the bachelor's level, thus ensuring that graduates of any ABET-accredited program have some minimal skill set for entry into the workforce or for future education.

EC 2000
For most of its history, ABET's accreditation criteria specifically outlined the major elements that accredited engineering programs must have, including the program curricula, the faculty type and the facilities. However, in the mid-1990s, the engineering community began to question the appropriateness of such rigid accreditation requirements.

After intense discussion, in 1997, ABET adopted Engineering Criteria 2000 (EC2000). The EC2000 criteria shifted the focus away from the inputs (what material is taught) and to the outputs (what students learned). EC2000 stresses continuous improvement and accounts for specific missions and goals of the individual institutions and programs. 
The intention of this approach was to enable innovation in engineering programs rather than forcing all programs to conform to a standard, as well as to encourage new assessment processes and program improvements.

ISO 9000:2015 
ABET- Accreditation is certified by the International Organization for Standardization. ISO 9000 family of quality management systems standards is designed to help organizations ensure that they meet the needs of customers and other stakeholders while meeting statutory and regulatory requirements related to a product or service.

International recognition 
ABET's accreditation process is recognized by these international entities:

Miscellaneous
To become a licensed professional engineer, one common prerequisite is graduation from an Engineering Accreditation Commission (EAC) of ABET-accredited program. Requirements for professional engineer testing for EAC accredited programs vary from state to state.

The Engineering Credential Evaluation International (ECEI) was established in 1997 as the credential evaluation service of ABET. ECEI specialized in the evaluation of degrees in engineering, engineering technology, computer science and surveying from outside the U.S. As of October 30, 2006, ECEI stopped accepting applications for credentials evaluation; a business decision made by the ABET board of directors.

References

External links
 
 ABET accreditation commissions
 what programs does ABET accredit
 ABET FAQ from Wayne State University
 ABET Mutual Accreditation Recognition Agreements

Professional certification in engineering
Higher education accreditation
School accreditors
Educational organizations based in the United States
Organizations based in Baltimore
Organizations established in 1932
1932 establishments in the United States